Flood insurance is the specific insurance coverage issued against property loss from flooding. To determine risk factors for specific properties, insurers will often refer to topographical maps that denote lowlands, floodplains and other areas that are susceptible to flooding.

In the United States

Nationwide, only 20 percent of American homes at risk for floods are covered by flood insurance. Most private insurers do not insure against the peril of flood due to the prevalence of adverse selection, which is the purchase of insurance by persons most affected by the specific peril of flood. In traditional insurance, insurers use the economic law of large numbers to charge a relatively small fee to large numbers of people in order to pay the claims of the small numbers of claimants who have suffered a loss.

Some insurers provide privately written primary flood insurance for high-value residential properties, and for low-value and high value buildings, including through The Natural Catastrophe Insurance Program. However, claimants far outnumber the availability of flood insurance, since most private insurers view the probability of generating a profit from related premium payments to be remote.

In certain flood-prone areas, the federal government requires flood insurance to secure mortgage loans backed by federal agencies such as the FHA and VA. However, the program has never worked as insurance, because of adverse selection. It has never priced people out of living in very risky areas by charging an appropriate premium, instead, too few places are included in the must-insure category, and premiums are artificially low." The lack of flood insurance can be detrimental to many homeowners who may discover only after the damage has been done that their standard insurance policies do not cover flooding.

Flooding is defined by the Federal Emergency Management Agency (FEMA) as a general and temporary condition of partial or complete inundation of two or more acres of normally dry land area or two or more properties (at least one of which is your property) from: Overflow of inland waters, unusual and rapid accumulation or runoff of surface waters from any source, and mudflows. This can be brought on by landslides, hurricanes, earthquakes, or other natural disasters that influence flooding, but while a homeowner may, for example, have earthquake coverage, that coverage may not cover floods as a result of earthquakes.

Very few insurers in the US provide private market flood insurance coverage due to the hazard of flood typically being confined to a few areas. As a result, it is an unacceptable risk due to the inability to spread the risk to a wide enough population in order to absorb the potential catastrophic nature of the hazard. In response to this, the federal government created the National Flood Insurance Program (NFIP) in 1968.

The National Association of Insurance Commissioners (NAIC) found that 33 percent of U.S. heads of household still hold the false belief that flood damage is covered by a standard homeowners policy. FEMA states that approximately 50% of low flood zone risk borrowers think they are ineligible and cannot buy flood insurance. Anyone residing in a community participating in the NFIP can buy flood insurance, even renters. However, unless one lives in a designated floodplain and is required under the terms of a mortgage to purchase flood insurance, flood insurance does not go into effect until 30 days after the policy is first purchased.

Individuals who are eligible and who have mortgages on their homes are required by law to purchase a separate flood insurance policy through a private primary flood insurance company or through an insurance company that acts as a distributor for the NFIP. Flood insurance may be available for residents of approximately 19,000 communities nationwide through the NFIP. Flood insurance may be available through private primary flood insurance carriers in any of the 19,000 communities participating in the NFIP as well as other communities that are not participating in the NFIP. In March 2016, TypTap Insurance became the first private market, admitted carrier in the state of Florida to offer non NFIP flood coverage to policyholders.

After 2017 Hurricane Harvey, estimates of houses covered by flood insurance in the Texas resulting in over $30bn in property losses with only 40% of homes covered by flood insurance.

In the United Kingdom
Usually, the British insurers require from clients living in Flood Risk Areas to flood-proof their homes or face much higher premiums and excesses (American English: deductible).

In Canada

Historically, due to the rarity of flooding in Canada, it was the only Group of Eight member state not to offer some form of flood insurance. Partly in reaction to the 2013 Alberta floods, flood water protection offerings have been introduced as overland water protection or overland flood insurance.

References

 
Insurance